Bir Bulut Olsam (English: If I were a cloud) is a Turkish television series produced by Tims Productions and broadcast on Kanal D. It was aired from February 23, 2009 to 24 December 2009 . It was directed by Ulaş İnaç and written by Meral Okay. The music was composed by Aytekin Ataş.

Plot 
Narin Bulut who is yet to turn eighteen, has been married to Mustafa Bulut for more than a year. Mustafa is Narin's first cousin also which makes Narin to not accept him as a husband. Their marriage is yet to be consummated. Mustafa is epileptic and is obsessed with Narin. Mustafa's parents force him to marry again with Asiye. During his wedding, Mustafa shoots Narin. Narin is saved by Dr. Serdar Batur. Serdar gets to know about Narin's plight and Mustafa's obsession for Narin. The story revolves around Mustafa's failed attempts to claim Narin's love.

Cast 
 Engin Akyürek as Mustafa Bulut
 Melisa Sözen as Narin Bulut
 Engin Altan Düzyatan as Dr. Serdar Batur
 Aslıhan Gürbüz as Asiye Bulut
 Ünal Silver as Aslan Bulut
 Sema Keçik Karabel as Düriye Bulut
 Cahit Gök as Yaşar Bulut
 Burcu Binici as Gülengül Bulut 
 Haluk Cömert as Kadir Bulut
 Ebru Nil Aydın as Hatun Bulut
 Şukran Ovali as Bahar Açar
 Ahmet Kural as Harun
 Meral Okay as İnci Batur
 Selim Bayraktar as Mahmut Paşa
 Şinasi Yurtsever as Ali Asker
 Hülya Duyar as Fatma
 Berfu Öngören as Seher
 Suat Usta as İbo
 Murat Cemcir as Asil
 Cüneyt Yilmaz as Muko
 İlkaye Doğan as Safiye
 Hatice Sezer as Naciye
 Lebib Gökhan as Murat
 Duygu Zade as Zeynep
 Kübra Tekin as Melek
 İzzettin Atuğ as Ramo
 Mertcan Yilmaz as Samet
 Muhammed Aslan as Yusuf

International broadcast

External links

References 

Turkish drama television series
2009 Turkish television series debuts
2000s Turkish television series
2009 Turkish television series endings
Kanal D original programming
Turkish television series endings
Television shows set in Istanbul
Television series produced in Istanbul
Television series set in the 2010s